"Linchpin" is a single by American heavy metal band Fear Factory from their album Digimortal. It peaked at No. 31 on the Billboard Mainstream Rock chart.

The Linchpin EP was released on April 2, 2002 exclusively in Australia.

Music video
The music video shows shots of machinery and what appears to be a polygraph machine intercut with footage of individual band members playing while at times being surrounded by smoke or doused in a white liquid. A picture of the Vitruvian Man, along with a rendition of Fear Factory's logo can be seen briefly at the end of the video superimposed over lead singer Burton C. Bell. The video was directed by Thomas Mignone. Although the song has a "Radio Edit" version which omits the pre-chorus, the video contains the LP version.

Track listing

Australian tour EP

Track 6 was recorded at the Desert Sky Pavilion in Phoenix, Arizona on October 25, 1996. Track 7 was recorded at the Palace in St. Kilda, Melbourne on February 26, 1999.

Videos 2 to 5 make up the documentary The Making of Digimortal, directed by Doug Spangenberg.

Charts

Credits
Fear Factory
Burton C. Bell – vocals
Dino Cazares – guitar
Christian Olde Wolbers – bass
Raymond Herrera – drums

Additional
Rhys Fulber – keyboards, programming, production

References

2001 songs
2001 singles
2002 EPs
Fear Factory songs
Songs written by Burton C. Bell
Roadrunner Records singles
Songs written by Dino Cazares